Wilhelm Barthlott (born 1946 in Forst, Germany) is a German botanist and biomimetic materials scientist. His official botanical author citation is Barthlott.

Barthlott's areas of specialization are biodiversity (Global distribution, assessment, and change in biodiversity) and Bionics/Biomimetics (in particular, superhydrophobic biological surfaces and their technical applications).

He is one of the pioneers in the field of biological and technical interfaces. Based on his systematic research on plant surfaces, he developed self-cleaning (lotus effect) technical surfaces and technical surfaces, which permanently retain air under water (Salvinia effect). This led to a paradigm shift in particular areas of material science and facilitated the development of superhydrophobic biomimetic surfaces. His map of the global biodiversity distribution is the foundation for numerous research topics. Barthlott has been honored with many awards (e. g. the German Environment Award) and memberships in Academies (e. g. the German National Academy of Science Leopodina). A large red-flowering tropical shrub, Barthlottia madagascariensis and other plants are named after him.

Career 

Wilhelm Barthlott descends from a French Huguenots family, which arrived with Jacques Barthelot in 1698 on the grounds of the Maulbronn monastery in Germany, where his mother's family houses had existed already before 1520. He studied biology, physics, chemistry, and geography at the University of Heidelberg, Germany. He earned his doctorate in 1973 with a dissertation on systematics and biogeography of cacti investigated by means of scanning electron microscopy. He was appointed a professorship at the Free University of Berlin (Freie Universität Berlin) at the Institute for Systematic Botany and Plant Geography from 1982 to 1985. In 1985 he became the chair of systematic botany at the Botanical Institute of the University of Bonn and also the director of the Botanical Gardens. In 2003 he established the Nees Institute for Biodiversity of Plants as founding director. He was influential in the reorganization and expansion of both institutions.

Barthlott became emeritus in 2011, and continued as the head of the long-run research project "Biodiversität im Wandel" ("Biodiversity in Change") until 2015, of the Academy of Sciences and Literature of Mainz. He co-founded with Walter Erdelen (UNESCO) the Biodiversity Network in Bonn BION in 2011, which was implemented by Wilhelm Barthlott and his successor Maximilian Weigend in 2013. He is investigating biological and technical superhydrophobic interfaces within the scope of his research projects in biomimetics.

Barthlott published one of the internationally most cited papers in plant science. His work in materials science based on superhydrophobic Lotus Effect surfaces "can be considered the most famous inspiration from nature ....and has been widely applied...in our daily life and industrial productions".

Fields of work

Research 
Barthlott has done extensive research focusing on Andean South America and Africa, in particular, on the taxonomy and morphology of cacti, orchids and bromeliads, applying scanning electron microscopy and molecular methods. Barthlott's studies on carnivorous plants converged systematic and ecological research. These studies led to the discovery of the first protozoan trapping plant in the genus Genlisea. This plants also exhibit one of the highest evolutionary rates and has the smallest known genome among all flowering plants. The naming of Genlisea barthlottii pays tribute to his investigation in this regard. The shrub Barthlottia madagascariensis or the miniature Titan Arum Amorphophallus bartlottii and further species were named after him. Among his discoveries are the giant bromeliad Gregbrownia lyman-smithii (syn. Mezobromelia lyman-smithii) and epiphytic cacti such as Rhipsalis juengeri, Pfeiffera miyagawae and Schlumbergera orssichiana. A complete list of plants can be found on the IPNI.

His biogeographic-ecological work was mostly conducted in South America, West Africa and Madagascar concentrating on arid regions, epiphytes in tropical forest canopy, as well as tropical inselbergs. Additional works concentrated on the global mapping of biodiversity and its macroecological dependencies on the climate and other abiotic factors (Geodiversity), including migration and globalization. His Biodiversity Distribution Map has been published in numerous textbooks and has been the foundation for many postgraduate studies. In the framework of the BMBF-BIOTA-AFRICA project, which was led by him, the biodiversity patterns in Africa as a model continent were analyzed and potential impacts of climate change are investigated.

Bionics, biomimetics, and biological interfaces 
Wilhelm Barthlott was the first botanist using high resolution scanning electron microscopy systematically in the research of biological surfaces since 1970. Most prominent among his results was the discovery of the self-cleaning effect of superhydrophobic micro- and nanostructured surfaces, which were technically realized with the trademark Lotus Effect from 1998 on, and resulting products distributed worldwide. The patents and the trademark Lotus Effect are owned by the company Sto-AG. Today about 2000 publications per year are based on his discovery, while the physics behind self-cleaning surfaces is still not completely understood.

Currently, the research on biological interfaces and bionics is Barthlott's central area of interest. Ongoing research areas include air-retaining surfaces on the model of the floating fern Salvinia, which is based on a complex physical principle (Salvinia effect). Technical application of this effect is conceivable in shipping: By means of a reduction in frictional resistance ("passive air lubrication"), a 10% decrease in fuel consumption could potentially be achieved. Another application is the oil-water-separation by adsorption and transportation of oil on air retaining surfaces.

Honors and awards 
 1990 Member of the Academy of Science and Literature in Mainz
 1991 "Foreign Member" of the Linnean Society of London.
 1997 Member of the Academy of Science of North Rhine-Westphalia Düsseldorf
 1997 Karl-Heinz-Beckurts Award
 1998 Nomination for the German Future Innovation Award (Deutscher Zukunftspreis des Bundespräsidenten)
 1998 Order of Andrès Bello of President Rafael Caldera of the Republic of Venezuela
 1999 Member of the German National Academy of Sciences, Leopoldina
 1999 Philip Morris Award
 1999 German Environmental Prize (Deutscher Umweltpreis)
 2001 Treviranus Medal of the Association of German Biologists (Verband Deutscher Biologen)
 2001 GlobArt Award (Austria)
 2002 Cactus d'Or (Monaco)
 2004 Scientist in Residence of the University Duisburg-Essen
 2005 Innovation Award of the German Federal Ministry of Education and Research
 2006 Award of the university competition "Ingenious Inventors" (Hochschulwettbewerb Patente Erfinder) of North Rhine-Westphalia
 2007 Maecenas medal of the University of Bonn
 2010 – 2014 Director of the Board of the International Society of Bionic Engineering (ISBE), Beijing (China)

Publications 
Barthlott's publications comprise more than 470 titles, including books and articles. A complete directory can be found at Wilhelm Barthlott Google Scholar Citations

Selected works  

Barthlott, W. (2020): Plants and nature in Bible and Quran - how respect for nature connects us. - pp. 233–244 in Proceed. Conf. "Science and Actions for Species Protection: Noah's Arks for the 21st Century, May 2019, Eds. J.von Braun et al.. – The Pontifical Academy of Sciences PAS, Vatican City

Barthlott, W. et al. (2016): Pflanzen der Heiligen Bücher Bibel und Koran - النباتات في الكتب السماوية: الإنجيل و القرآن. BfN Skripten No. 448, 106 S.

Barthlott, W. et al. (2015): Biogeography and Biodiversity of Cacti. - Schumannia 7, pp. 1–205, ISSN 1437-2517
Barthlott, W. et al. (2014): Orchid seed diversity: A scanning electron microscopy survey. – Englera 32, pp. 1–244.

Barthlott, W. et al. (2007): The curious world of carnivorous plants. 244 pp., Timber Press

Barthlott, W. et al. (2005): Global centres of vascular plant diversity. Nova Acta Leopoldina 92 (342): 61-83

Burr, B. et al. (1995): Untersuchungen zur Ultraviolettreflexion von Angiospermenblüten. III. Dilleniidae und Asteridae. 186 pp , Akad. Wiss. Lit. Mainz. F. Steiner Verlag, Stuttgart.

Barthlott, W. & E. Wollenweber (1981): Zur Feinstruktur, Chemie und taxonomischen Signifikanz epicuticularer Wachse und ähnlicher Sekrete. 67 S., Akad. Wiss. Lit. Mainz. F. Steiner Verlag, Stuttgart.
Barthlott, W. (1979): Cacti. 249 S., Stanley Thornes Publishers, London.
Barthlott, W. & N. Ehler (1977): Raster-Elektronenmikroskopie der Epidermis-Oberflächen von Spermatophyten. 105 pp ., Akad. Wiss. Lit. Mainz. F. Steiner Verlag, Stuttgart.

References

External links 
 Literatur von und über Wilhelm Barthlott im Katalog der Deutschen Nationalbibliothek
 Autoreintrag und Liste der beschriebenen Pflanzennamen für Wilhelm Barthlott beim IPNI
 Google Scholar Citations Wilhelm Barthlott
 ResearchGate Wilhelm Barthlott
 "Prof.Dr. Wilhelm Barthlott: 99 seconds for the future of biodiversity" "Der Lotus-Effekt" by Philip Morris Stiftung 1998
 "Lufthaltende Schiffsbeschichtungen nach biologischem Vorbild zur Reibungsreduktion" Fraunhofer UMSICHT
 Nees-Institut für Biodiversität der Rheinischen Friedrich-Wilhelms-Universität Bonn
 Botanische Gärten der Rheinischen Friedrich-Wilhelms-Universität Bonn (http://www.botgart.uni-bonn.de)
 BMBF-BIOTA AFRIKA-Projekt (http://www.biota-africa.org)
 BION Bonn (http://www.bion-bonn.org/de)
 Akademie der Wissenschaft und der Literatur, Mainz
 Bundesamt für Naturschutz (http://www.bfn.de/religionen_und_natur.html)

1946 births
20th-century German botanists
Living people
Members of the German Academy of Sciences Leopoldina
21st-century German botanists
Academic staff of the University of Bonn